The West Indies cricket team toured Bangladesh in October 2011. The tour consisted  of one Twenty20 (T20), two Test matches and three One Day Internationals (ODIs).

Squads

Tour matches

Bangladesh Cricket Board XI v West Indians

Bangladesh Cricket Board XI v West Indians

Twenty20 Series

Only T20I

ODI series

1st ODI

2nd ODI

3rd ODI

Test series

1st Test

2nd Test

References

External links
 Future tour program

2011-12
2011 in West Indian cricket
2011 in Bangladeshi cricket
International cricket competitions in 2011–12
Bangladeshi cricket seasons from 2000–01